Smt. VHD Central Institute of Home Science, is one of the premier women's college located at Palace Road, Gandhi Nagar, Bangalore, Karnatka. It is established in the year 1961. The college is affiliated with Bangalore University. This college offers different undergraduate and postgraduate courses in arts and science.

Departments

Home Science
Early Childhood Education
Sociology
Extension Education and Communication
Food and Nutrition
Family Resource Management
Physics
Human Development
Textile and Clothing
Chemistry
Clinical Nutrition and Dietics
Commerce

Accreditation
The college is  recognized by the University Grants Commission (UGC).

References

External links
http://gfgc.kar.nic.in/vhdhomescience/

Educational institutions established in 1961
1961 establishments in Mysore State
Colleges affiliated to Bangalore University
Colleges in Bangalore